In at the Deep End is the debut album of London-based grime collective Roll Deep. It went silver in the United Kingdom, selling more than 85,000 copies. The album won Best Album at the 2005 Urban Music Awards.

"Shake a Leg" and "The Avenue" (or simply, "Avenue") were both top 40 hits.

Track list

Charts

Sales and certifications

Featured on the album

Roachee,
Wiley,
Scratchy,
Trim,
Manga,
Breeze,
Flow Dan,
Jet Li,
Brazen,
Biggie Pitbull,
Ricky Nek,
Killa P,
Jamakabi,
Riko,
Mega Montana,
J2K,
Alex Mills,
Donae'o

References

2005 debut albums
Roll Deep albums